The following are the association football events of the year 1899 throughout the world.

Events
January 8: FC Freiburg are champions of south Germany.
February: German club Werder Bremen established, Knattspyrnufélag Reykjavíkur founded
March 12: Final of first official Swiss championship, won by the Anglo-American Club de Zürich
March 20: England defeat Wales 4-0 in Bristol.
May 3: Hungarian club Ferencvárosi TC founded
May 14: Uruguayan club, Club Nacional de Football is founded being the second Uruguayan football club to be founded and the first Latin American club founded by natives. German club Eintracht Frankfurt founded
July 1: German club TSG 1899 Hoffenheim founded
August 10: Norwegian club Viking FK founded
August 31: French club Olympique de Marseille founded
November 29: Spanish Club FC Barcelona founded
December 16: Italian club AC Milan founded

National champions

Argentina: Belgrano Athletic
Belgium: FC Liégeois
England: Aston Villa
France: Le Havre
Ireland: Distillery

Italy: Genoa
Netherlands: RAP Amsterdam
Scotland: 
Division One: Rangers
Scottish Cup: Celtic
Sweden: Örgryte IS
Switzerland: Anglo-American Club de Zürich (first official champions)

International tournaments
1899 British Home Championship (March 2 – April 8, 1899)

Births
 February 15 – Sid White, English professional footballer (d. 1968)
 March 15 – Arie Bieshaar, Dutch footballer (d. 1965)
 July 11 – Frits Kuipers, Dutch footballer (d. 1943)
 October 30 – Georges Capdeville, French football referee (d. 1991)

Deaths

Clubs founded
 AC Milan
 FC Barcelona
 Viking FK
 Olympique de Marseille
 Club Nacional de Football
 Ferencvárosi TC
 Werder Bremen
 SK Rapid Wien
 Eintracht Frankfurt
 VfL Osnabrück

References 

 
Association football by year